Stevie Holland (born January 11, 1965) is an American jazz and cabaret singer, lyricist, playwright and actress.

Raised in Westchester County, New York, she moved to New York City to study drama at New York University's Tisch School of the Arts. She has toured nationally in the U.S. and performed at Iridium Jazz Club, Jazz at Lincoln Center, The Town Hall, and Merkin Concert Hall in New York City. Her cabaret performances won a Bistro Award from Backstage magazine for Outstanding Vocalist of the Year (2004).

Holland is married to composer Gary William Friedman, with whom she has collaborated on several albums and theater productions. Her solo albums include Before Love Has Gone, which was picked as a top album of 2008 by USA Today.

She starred as Linda Lee Thomas, the wife of Cole Porter, in the Off-Broadway musical she co-created Love, Linda: The Life of Mrs. Cole Porter (2009–2018).

Discography
 Do You Ever Dream (150 Music, 2000)
 Almost Like Being in Love (150 Music, 2003)
 Restless Willow (150 Music, 2004)
 More Than Words Can Say (150 Music, 2006)
 Before Love Has Gone (150 Music, 2008)
 Love, Linda: The Life of Mrs. Cole Porter (150 Music, 2010)
 Life Goes On (150 Music 2015)

References

External links
 
 

1965 births
Living people
Jazz musicians from New York (state)
People from Westchester County, New York
Singers from New York City
Tisch School of the Arts alumni
American cabaret performers
American jazz singers
American women jazz singers